Lievin Cruyl or Lieven Cruyl (name variations: Levin Cruijl, Lievin Cruijl, Levin Cruyl, Livinus Cruylius, Cruylius Livinus) (5 September 1634 – before 1720) was a Flemish priest and a draughtsman and etcher of landscapes, seascapes, and architectural views. The drawings and etchings he made during his extended stays in Italy and Paris contributed to the development of the topographical views known as veduta.

Life
He was born in Ghent, the illegitimate (later legitimised) son of Joannae (Joanna) Meyerts and Guglielmus (Willem) Cruyl. The details about his life are not always clear, including with respect to the periods of his overseas residences.  He studied theology, architecture, drawing and etching at the University of Leuven. He was a priest in Wetteren near Ghent from 1660 to 1664. He was involved as an architect in the completion of the Saint Michael's Church, Ghent, the construction of which had been interrupted because of the iconoclastic troubles of the 16th century. He made a design for the unfinished western tower in a Brabantine Gothic style in 1662. The design was finally not implemented due to cost concerns.

He travelled to Rome where he resided from 1664 to 1675. He travelled in Italy and was in Venice in 1676.  He spent time in France between 1680 and 1684 and returned to Ghent in 1684.  He made trips to France and is recorded in Paris in 1688. In Ghent he was again involved in an architectural design project, this time for the spire of the Belfry of Ghent.  His design for a Baroque spire dated 1684 was finally not implemented.

He died in Ghent.

Work

Lieven Cruyl is mainly known for his drawings and graphic work depicting cityscapes. He made series of drawings as well as individual renderings of the landmarks of Rome.  Several of the drawings were later engraved by himself and others including by Giulio Testa. His drawings were dated, frequently by month, between 1664 and 1666 and convey a picture of a busy living city filled with ruins.  This was a change from the more staged approach of classicizing painters. The panoramic settings of the drawings and the precise technique are believed to have set a standard for veduta designers and painters after him such as the Dutchman Gaspar van Wittel. He also had a subtle influence on Giovanni Battista Falda's engravings of contemporary and antique structures in Rome.

Cruyl's drawings depict the topographical aspects of the urban landscape. He preferred unusual and complex perspectives which reflect the scientific construction of his drawings. His drawings reconstruct the city anew according to a specific aesthetic taste and guidelines of a graphic structure. Rome's cityscape was undergoing significant changes at the time because of the extensive building works promoted by pope Alexander VII to enhance the dignity of Rome and himself as the Head of the Catholic Church. Cruyl's drawings with their idealised view of Rome can to a certain extent be regarded as propaganda for pope Pope Alexander VII's urban vision of Rome. The views of Lieven Cruyl were also published to meet the demand of foreigners who wanted to keep souvenirs of their visit.

He also made drawings of other Italian cities such as Florence and Venice and of places in Paris.  He further drew a number of imaginary cityscapes of Jeruzalem.

A drawing of the View of the construction of the Pont-Royal, Paris, in 1687 was sold at Christie's in London in 2009 for £97,250.

Selected works

A set of Twenty-three Plates of Ancient and Modern Rome; L. Cruyl del. et scul. 1665.
A set of Views of Roman Ruins &c.; 1667.
The Triumphs of the Roman Emperors; after Andrea Mantegna; ten plates.

Notes

Bibliography
 Benezit (2006). "Cruyl, Liévin", vol. 4, p. 249, in Benezit Dictionary of Artists. Paris: Gründ. .
 Esther, J.-P. (1996). "Cruyl, Lieven", vol. 8. p. 220, in The Dictionary of Art, 34 volumes, edited by Jane Turner. New York: Grove. .
Jatta, Barbara; Connors, Joseph (1989). Vedute romane di Lievin Cruyl: paesaggio urbano sotto Alessandro VII (exhibition catalog). Rome: Accademia americana in Roma. .
 Jatta, Barbara (1992). Lievin Cruyl e la sua opera grafica: un artista fiammingo nell'Italia del seicento. Brussels/Rome: Institut historique belge de Rome. .

External links

Facsimile of the Prospectus locorum urbis Romae insicnium
Works of Lieven Cruyl at The Cleveland Museum of Art
Lievin Cruyl on artnet
Colin Eisler – Power to Europe's Chosen Peoples. A New Maccabean Page for Louis XIV by Liévin Cruyl, in: Artibus et Historiae no. 17 (IX), 1988, pp. 31–38

17th-century engravers
18th-century engravers
Flemish engravers
Clergy from Ghent
1634 births
1720 deaths
Artists from Ghent
Flemish priests